Hands Across the Border is a 1926 American silent Western film directed by David Kirkland and starring Fred Thomson, Bess Flowers and Tyrone Power Sr.

Cast
 Fred Thomson as Ted Drake 
 Bess Flowers as Ysabel Castro 
 Tyrone Power Sr. as John Drake
 William Courtright as Grimes 
 Clarence Geldart as Don Castro 
 Tom Santschi as Breen

References

External links
 

1926 films
1926 Western (genre) films
Films directed by David Kirkland
Film Booking Offices of America films
Silent American Western (genre) films
1920s English-language films
1920s American films